The Old Believer is the third studio album by American band The Atlas Moth. It was released on June 10, 2014 under Profound Lore Records.

Track list

References

2014 albums
Profound Lore Records albums
The Atlas Moth albums